The Thailand LPGA Masters is a women's professional golf tournament to be held in Thailand. It was first played on the Thai LPGA Tour in 2013. In 2016, the tournament was co-sanctioned by the ALPG Tour. From 2017 to 2019, the tournament was co-sanctioned by both the China LPGA Tour and ALPG Tour.

Tournament names 
 2013–2014: Thailand LPGA Masters
2015, 2017–2018: PTT Thailand LPGA Masters
2016: Idemitsu-SAT Thailand LPGA Masters
 2019: Trust Golf Thailand LPGA Masters
 2020: Muang Thai Insurance Thailand LPGA Masters
 2021–present: BGC Thailand LPGA Masters

Winners

References

Golf tournaments in Thailand
China LPGA Tour events
ALPG Tour events